is a Japanese snowboarder. She has represented Japan at the Winter Olympics on four occasions: 2006 in Torino, 2010 in Vancouver, 2014 in Sochi, and 2018 in Pyeongchang.

References

1986 births
Snowboarders at the 2006 Winter Olympics
Snowboarders at the 2010 Winter Olympics
Snowboarders at the 2014 Winter Olympics
Snowboarders at the 2018 Winter Olympics
Living people
Olympic snowboarders of Japan
Japanese female snowboarders
21st-century Japanese women